An Itchen ferry is a type of small gaff rig cutter.

Itchen ferry may also refer to the following in Hampshire, England:
Itchen Ferry village, took its name from the above boat
Woolston Floating Bridge, historically referred to as the Itchen Ferry

See also
Itchen (disambiguation)